Lynn Davis Brenton (October 7, 1889 – October 14, 1968) was a Major League Baseball pitcher who played for four seasons. He played for the Cleveland Indians in 1913 and 1915 and the Cincinnati Reds from 1920 to 1921.

External links

1889 births
1968 deaths
Cleveland Naps players
Cleveland Indians players
Cincinnati Reds players
Baseball players from Illinois
Toledo Mud Hens players
New Orleans Pelicans (baseball) players
Cleveland Bearcats players
Cleveland Spiders (minor league) players
Portland Beavers players
Sacramento Senators players
Oakland Oaks (baseball) players
Seattle Rainiers players